Rubeli Bluff  is a bluff on the north end of the Reinbolt Hills, at the east margin of Amery Ice Shelf. A survey station was established on the feature during the ANARE (Australian National Antarctic Research Expeditions) tellurometer traverse from Larsemann Hills in 1968. Named by Antarctic Names Committee of Australia (ANCA) for M.N. Rubeli, surveyor at Mawson Station, who was in charge of the traverse.
 

Cliffs of Mac. Robertson Land
Ingrid Christensen Coast